The Thailand national under-20 futsal team for under 20 level represents Thailand in international futsal competitions and is controlled by the Futsal Commission of the Football Association of Thailand.

Nickname
Thailand national under-20 futsal team was dubbed by the medias and supporters as "Toh-Lek" ( lit. small table ) or "Toh-Lek-Team-Chad-Thai" ( lit. Thai national small table ) for more specific.

Toh-Lek or The Small Table itself is the general slang term to call the Futsal as the sport in Thailand. Thai language adopts the original word Futsal and uses it to call the kind of sport. However, Thai people also commonly refer to it as Toh-Lek since it represents the game of football that plays on a smaller field. The Small Table has slowly become the alias of Thailand national under-20 futsal team.

Home stadiums

Thailand plays the home games at the Bangkok Futsal Arena with a capacity of 12,000 spectators and the Indoor Stadium Huamark with a capacity of 10,000 spectators.

Competition history

AFC U-20 Futsal Championship

Players

Current squad

Results and fixtures

All time results

Recent results within last 12 months and upcoming fixtures.

2017
Friendly

2017 AFC U-20 Futsal Championship

Players

Current squad 
The following 14 players were called up for the 2017 AFC U-20 Futsal Championship in Thailand between 16 and 26 May 2017.

The following players were called up:

Coaches history

References

External links
 Football Association of Thailand 

Asian national futsal teams
Futsal
National